The 1942 California gubernatorial election was held on November 3, 1942. Earl Warren won and became the 30th governor of California.

General election results

References
 Our Campaigns

Gubernatorial
1942
California
November 1942 events